The Roy River is a tributary of Caopatina Lake, flowing into the municipality of Eeyou Istchee James Bay (municipality), in Jamésie, in the administrative region of Nord-du-Québec, in Quebec, Canada. The northern part of Caopatina Lake is crossed to the west by the Opawica River.

The Roy River crosses successively the townships of Chambalon, Pambrun and Hazeur. Forestry is the main economic activity of the sector; recreational tourism activities, second.

The Roy River Valley is served by the R1032 (North-South) forest road that passes on the east side and by secondary forest roads.
 
The surface of the Roy River is usually frozen from early November to mid-May, however, safe ice circulation is generally from mid-November to mid-April.

Geography

Toponymy 
At various times in history, this territory has been occupied by the Attikameks, the Algonquin and the Cree. The term "Roy" is a family name of French origin.

The toponym "Rivière Roy" was officialized on December 5, 1968, at the Commission de toponymie du Québec, when it was created.

Notes and references

See also 

Rivers of Nord-du-Québec
Jamésie
Nottaway River drainage basin